Kureh Bolagh (also Romanized as Kūreh Bolāgh; also known as Kūrā Bolāgh) is a village in Gavdul-e Markazi Rural District, in the Central District of Malekan County, East Azerbaijan Province, Iran. At the 2006 census, its population was 196, in 59 families.

References 

Populated places in Malekan County